Maria Dorothea Robinson, née Webb (1840–1920) was an Irish-British painter active in St. Ives, Cornwall.

Life

Robinson was born in Ireland and moved to Paris, where she was a pupil at the Académie Julian. She met and married the painter Henry Harewood Robinson and they lived in St. Ives, Cornwall from 1885. That year she had a picture, A Pool in the Rocks, shown at the Royal Academy in London. She is known for genre works depicting St. Ives and the Brittany coast.

Robinson died in York in 1920.

References

External links

 Maria D. Webb-Robinson on artnet

1840 births
1920 deaths
19th-century British women artists
Académie Julian alumni
Artists from Northern Ireland
British women painters